The Thompson Boxmoth is an American unconventional tandem wing aircraft that was built in the early 1970s by the Thompson Aircraft Company. Patent US39309624, Jan 6, 1976.  Only one was constructed.

Design and development
The Boxmoth is an open frame, conventional landing gear equipped aircraft with two tube made, vinyl covered wings in tandem. Each of pair of the box-wings are shaped like a diamond from the front, or a biplane configuration with the wings joined at the outboard wingtips. The rear wing acts as a tailplane and houses a vertical internal rudder surface. The configuration is also similar to a rhomboidal box kite. The engine and propeller are mounted in the center of the forward wing. The fuselage is constructed from aluminum tubing with aircraft fabric covering.

Specifications (Boxmoth)

See also

References

External links
Photo of the Boxmoth

Homebuilt aircraft